is one of the three royal mausoleums of the Ryukyu Kingdom, along with Tamaudun at Shuri Castle and Urasoe yōdore at Urasoe Castle. It is located near Izena Castle in Izena, Okinawa. It was built in 1501 by King Shō Shin.

Burials
 Shō Shoku (d. 1434), father of Shō En
 , mother of Shō En
 Ogiyaka (1445–1505), Queen consort of Shō En, Queen regent of Shō Shin
 Hiroshi Shō (1918–1996), 22nd head of the Shō family
 , daughter of Shō Shō, 19th Kikoe-ōgimi

References

Ryukyu Kingdom
Mausoleums in Japan
Buildings and structures completed in 1501
1501 establishments in Asia